Gaines Charter Township is a charter township of Kent County in the U.S. state of Michigan. The population was 25,146 at the 2010 census.

Communities
In 1866, three Cody brothers built a steam-powered grist mill and sawmill here, and the place became known as "Cody's Mills". A village named "Corinth" was platted and recorded for Jacob and David Rosenberg by Robert S. Jackson on September 14, 1871. A post office named Cody's Mills was established in May 1867. It was renamed Corinth in March 1871 and operated until December 1899.
 Cutlerville is an unincorporated community and census-designated place in the northwest of the township.  The CDP also extends mostly into Byron Township to the west.
Dutton is an unincorporated community centered at the intersection of Dutton Avenue and 68th Street.  It was first settled in 1870. 
Gaines Center had a post office from 1854 to 1856.
Gainesville was a station on the Grand Rapids and Indiana Railroad. It had a post office from 1856 until 1871.

History
Gaines Township was established in 1848.

Geography

It is directly south of the city of Kentwood. Caledonia Charter Township and the village of Caledonia are to the east. Leighton Township in Allegan County is to the south and Byron Township to the west.

Major highways
  runs parallel near the entire western border but does not run within the township.
  runs west–east near the northern edge of the township.

Education
Gaines Township is served by three separate public school districts.  The majority of the township is served by Caledonia Community Schools to the east in Caledonia Township.  The western portion of the township is served by Bryon Center Public Schools in Byron Center, while the northwestern corner is served by Kentwood Public Schools in Kentwood.

Demographics
As of the 2010 United States Census, there were 25,146 people, 9,220 households, and 6,740 families in the township. The racial makeup of the township was 77.5% White, 9.0% African American, 0.40% Native American, 4.6% Asian, 0.02% Pacific Islander, 0.01% from other races, and 2.1% from two or more races. Hispanic or Latino of any race were 6.1% of the population.

There were 9,220 households, out of which 38.3% had children under the age of 18 living with them, 56.2% were married couples living together, 12.6% had a female householder with no husband present, and 26.9% were non-families. 21.9% of all households were made up of individuals, and 6.1% had someone living alone who was 65 years of age or older. The average household size was 2.69 and the average family size was 3.15.

The township population contained 27.5% under the age of 18, 9.0% from 18 to 24, 27.6% from 25 to 44, 25.4% from 45 to 64, and 10.5% who were 65 years of age or older. The median age was 32 years. For every 100 females, there were 96.5 males. For every 100 females age 18 and over, there were 94.5 males.

The median income for a household in the township was $53,415, and the median income for a family was $56,402. About 3.2% of families and 5.4% of the population were below the poverty line, including 4.0% of those under age 18 and 4.4% of those age 65 or over. Males had a median income of $41,446 versus $27,333 for females. The per capita income for the township was $23,459.

References

External links
Official website

Townships in Kent County, Michigan
Charter townships in Michigan
Grand Rapids metropolitan area
1848 establishments in Michigan
Populated places established in 1848